The Roman Catholic Diocese of Lescar (Latin: Dioecesis Lascurrensis; French: Diocèse de Lescar; Basque: Leskarreko elizbarrutia), in south-western France, was founded in the fifth century, and continued until 1790.  It was originally part of the Province of Novempopulania, and Lescar held the seventh place among the cities. Its see was the Cathedral of the Assumption in Lescar, begun in 1120; the crypt of the cathedral was also the mausoleum of the family of Albret in the 16th century.

The bishopric was suppressed by the Legislative Assembly during the French Revolution , in the Civil Constitution of the Clergy in September 1790, as part of a systematic effort to eliminate redundant bishoprics in France.  By the Concordat of 1801, struck by First Consul Napoleon Bonaparte and Pope Pius VII, the diocese of Lescar was not revived, and the territory of the diocese was divided between the diocese of Agen and the diocese of Bayonne.

Bishops of Lescar

to 1200

 ? c. 506: Saint Julien I.
 c. 506?: Galactorius of Lescar
 c. 585: Sabinus or Savin
 c. 680: Julien II.
 c. 731: Julien III.
 c. 841: Spaleus
 841–1059: Vacant
 c. 1059: Raymond I. le Vieux
 1061–1072: Gregor
 1075–1080: Bernard I.
 1095–1115: Sanche I.
 1115–1141: Gui or Guido de Loth (Guy de Lons)
 1147–1154: Raymond II. d'Assade
 c. 1168: Eudes I. or Odon
 c. 1170: Guillaume I.
 c. 1180: Sanche II. Aner or Sanzanier de Gerderest

1200 to 1400

 c. 1200: Bertrand I.
 1205–1213: Arsias
 c. 1220: Raymond III. de Bénac
 c. 1231: Sanctius
 1247–1268: Bertrand II. de La Mothe
 1269–1292: Arnaud I. de Morlanne (or de Morlaas)
 1293–1301: Raymond IV. Auger
 1303–1320: Arnaud II. d'Arbus
 1320–1321: Guillaume II.
 1321–1325: Arnaud III. de Saut
 1326–1348: Raymond V. d'Andoins
 1348–1352: Arnaud IV.
 1352–1361: Guillaume III. d'Andoins
 1362–1368: Bernard II.
 1368–1401: Eudes II.

1400 to 1600

 1402–1404: Jean I. (Avignon Obedience)
 1405–1422: Cardinal Pierre de Foix (Appointed by Alexander V)
 1425–1428: Arnaud V. de Salies or Salinis
 1428–1433: Arnaud VI. d'Abadie
 1453–1460: Pierre II. de Foix
 1460–1475: Jean II. de Lévis
 1481–1492: Robert d'Épinay
 1513–1515: Cardinal Amanieu d'Albret
 1518–1525: Jean III. de La Salle
 1525–1530: Paul de Béarn (or de Foix)
 1532–1553: Jacques de Foix
 1554–1555: Jean IV. de Capdeville
 1555: Cardinal Georges d'Armagnac, Administrator
 1555–1569: Louis d'Albret
 1575–1590: Jean V.

1600 to 1800

 1600–1609: Jean-Pierre d'Abadie
 1609–1632: Jean VI. de Salettes
 1632–1658: Jean-Henri de Salettes
 1658–1681: Jean VII. du Haut de Salies
 1681–1716: Dominique Deslaux de Mesplès
 1716–1729: Martin de Lacassaigne
 1730–1762: Hardouin de Châlons
 1763–1790 (1801): Marc-Antoine de Noé

See also
 Catholic Church in France
 List of Catholic dioceses in France

Notes

Bibliography

Reference books
 pp. 563–564.  (Use with caution; obsolete)
  p. 295. (in Latin)
 p. 173.
 pp. 219–220.
 p. 216.
 pp. 237–238.
 p. 254.

Studies

 p. 100.

Lescar
Lescar
6th-century establishments in Francia
1801 disestablishments in France